Pomas is a commune in the Aude department in Occitanie southern France. It is located 4 km northwest of Saint-Hilaire, 15 km south of Carcassonne, 100 km southeast of Toulouse.

History
Pomas dates back to the 9th century when it was known as Pomaris.
In 1212, the local lord, Bernard de Pomars, a Cathar, was denounced as a heretic; his lands were taken and given to Philippe Golhoin. 
In 1559, the Rabot family took over the lordship of Pomas. The lordship was sold off in 1719.

Attractions
The château de Pomas dates back to the 12th century and is notable for its square tower and cruciform archers' windows.

Pomas has small, single track railway station, on the Carcassonne - Rivesaltes railway line, between Verzeille and Limoux.

Its shops include a bakery, a specialist local wine shop, and a tobacconist.  It has a small private museum specialising in exotic shells.

There are attractive walking routes in the hills around Pomas.

Population

See also
Communes of the Aude department

References

Communes of Aude